VCM may refer to:
 Variable Cylinder Management, Honda's term for a variable-displacement technology
 Variable Coding and Modulation, a technique for optimizing satellite broadcasts
 Vermont City Marathon, a marathon in Burlington, Vermont
 Virtual Channel Memory, a memory architecture which was originally developed by NEC
 Vinyl chloride monomer, a compound used to produce polyvinyl chloride
 Vecima networks, a maker of telecommunications equipment
 Victoria Conservatory of Music, a Canadian music school
 Virtual Collection of Masterpieces, a search platform to a collection of Asian masterpieces
 Victoria Coren Mitchell, (Born 18 August 1972) an English writer, presenter and professional poker player
 Voce del padrone-Columbia-Marconiphone, an Italian record label
 Voice Coil Motor, an electric linear motor used to position hard drive heads.
 Value Continuum Machine tbd.